CREG is an acronym that can represent:

 Centres de recherche en gestion, a management research center based at Pau's University, France
 China Railway Engineering Equipment Group, a subsidiary of China Railway Group Limited
 China Recycling Energy Corporation (Nasdaq: CREG)
 Chongqing Road Engineering Group
 Electricity and Gas Regulation Commission, an Algerian public service organisation
 , a Belgian public service organisation

See also
 CREG1 (Cellular Repressor of E1A-stimulated Genes 1)
 Craig (disambiguation)